Feihe is a town in Baohe District, Hefei, Anhui. , it administers three residential neighborhoods: Ge Dadian, Laoguantang, and Jiadaying, as well as the following six villages:
Huangzhen Village
Weixiang Village
Huangxiang Village
Pingtangwang Village
Xijing Village
Guanzhen Village

References

Hefei
Township-level divisions of Anhui